Conus blatteus is a species of sea snail, a marine gastropod mollusk, in the family Conidae, the cone snails and their allies.

Description
This rare species attains a size of 45 mm.

Distribution
Philippines.

References

blatteus